Hemogenic endothelium is a special subset of endothelial cells scattered within blood vessels that can differentiate into haematopoietic cells.

The development of hematopoietic cells in the embryo proceeds sequentially from mesoderm through the hemangioblast to the hemogenic endothelium and hematopoietic progenitors.

See also
Hemangioblast

References

Cell biology